William Henry Metcalf VC, MM & Bar (29 January 1894 – 8 August 1968) was an American soldier in the Canadian Army during World War I. Metcalf was a recipient of the Victoria Cross, the highest award for gallantry in the face of the enemy that can be awarded to British and Commonwealth forces. Although Metcalf was born in the United States, Metcalf is also considered Canadian since he joined the Canadian Expeditionary Force in 1914. He is one of only six Americans to receive the Victoria Cross.

Military service
Metcalf is one of seven Canadian soldiers to be awarded the Victoria Cross on 2 September 1918 for actions across the  Drocourt-Quéant Line near Arras, France. The other six are: Bellenden Hutcheson, Arthur George Knight, Claude Joseph Patrick Nunney, Cyrus Wesley Peck, Walter Leigh Rayfield and John Francis Young.

He was 23 years old and a lance corporal in the 16th (Canadian Scottish) Battalion, Canadian Expeditionary Force, during the First World War when he committed the following deed for which he was awarded the Victoria Cross.

On 2 September 1918 at Arras, France, when the right flank of the battalion was held up, Lance Corporal Metcalf rushed forward under intense machine-gun fire to a passing tank and with his signal flag walked in front of the tank directing it along the trench in a perfect hail of bullets and bombs. The machine-gun strongpoint was overcome, very heavy casualties were inflicted and a critical situation was relieved. Later, although wounded, Corporal Metcalf continued to advance until ordered to get into a shell hole and have his wounds dressed.

Victoria Cross citation
The citation reads:

In addition to the Victoria Cross, he was awarded the Military Medal and Bar.

References

External links
William Henry Metcalf's digitized service file
The Canadian Scottish Regiment (Princess Mary's) Warrant Officers' and Sergeants' Mess (Lance-Corporal William Henry Metcalf entry)
Burial location of William Metcalf "Eastport, Maine, USA"
News item "William Metcalf's Victoria Cross donated to the Canadian Scottish Regiment Museum"
Legion Magazine-The Magnificent Seven

1890s births
1968 deaths
Canadian Expeditionary Force soldiers
Canadian World War I recipients of the Victoria Cross
Canadian recipients of the Military Medal
Rensselaer Polytechnic Institute alumni
People from Eastport, Maine
American recipients of the Victoria Cross
People from South Portland, Maine
People from Washington County, Maine
Military personnel from Maine
Canadian Scottish Regiment (Princess Mary's)
Canadian Scottish Regiment (Princess Mary's) soldiers